Captain James Sulivane (sometimes spelled Sullivane) was the primary catalyst in the growth and development the town of East New Market, Maryland.  In 1776, James Sulivane combined several tracts of land and resurveyed the  tract as "Newmarket".  In 1785 he carved out the town's first 20 lots on the northwest part of his property.  James Sulivane chose the name "New Market" most probably because he had horse racing in mind.  Newmarket, Suffolk is the notable horse racing town in England.  Horse Racing had a short, but prominent history in Newmarket (as it was then known), Dorchester County.  Horse racing was first mentioned as early as 1777 in a report by Thomas Sparrow to the Maryland Council of Safety.  "...I intended next to go to New Market, Dorchester County as I understood there was to be two days races, but my friends advised me not,..."  Over twelve horse racing notices from the newspapers, "Maryland Herald and Eastern Shore Intelligencer" and the "Easton Republican Star" dating from the 1790s to 1821 mention the races at New Market.  In 2006, Brian Tolley, a manager for a company engaged in aerial photography and satellite image processing, located the site of the race track using aerial photos from 1938 and 1957.  

Captain James Sulivane was born March 30, 1737, possibly at East New Market's Friendship Hall.  Sulivane married Mary Ennalls in the early 1760s and had at least four children.

American War of Independence 

James Sulivane was also a prominent local figure in the American Revolutionary War.  He served as a 2nd Lieutenant and Captain for a local militia group that he organized.  The group was called "The New Market Blues".  Sulivane later served as the Deputy Assistant Commissary for the Continental Army.  As commissary, he would obtain arms, food, clothing, and other provisions for the army.

External links
 East New Market, Maryland
 East New Market: A Comprehensive History Online

People of colonial Maryland
Continental Army officers from Maryland
1737 births
Year of death unknown
People from Dorchester County, Maryland
Date of death missing